Oluwaseun Oyegunle (born 3 November 2002) is a Canadian professional soccer player who plays as a defender.

Early life
Oyegunle began playing organized soccer at age seven with Brampton East SC. When he was 15, he joined Sigma FC.

College career
In January 2021, he began attending Syracuse University, where he played for the men's soccer team. He had initially been set to join in September 2020, however, he delayed it due to the COVID-19 pandemic. He made his debut during the 2021 Spring season against the Hofstra Pride. In his first season during the 2021 Spring, he made seven appearances.

Club career
In 2018, Oyegunle made his senior debut in League1 Ontario with Sigma FC, and would make a total of five appearances that season. In 2019, he made twelve league appearances for Sigma and made one additional appearance in the League1 Ontario playoffs.

In September 2019, Oyegunle signed his first professional contract with Canadian Premier League side Forge FC. On October 12, 2019, he made his debut as a substitute in a 4–0 loss to York9 FC, at age sixteen.

In 2022, he returned to League1 Ontario with Sigma FC. He was named a league Second Team All-Star and U20 All-Star in 2022.

International career
In August 2019, Oyegunle received his first international call-up for a Canada U17 preparation camp ahead of the 2019 FIFA U-17 World Cup.

References

External links

2002 births
Living people
Association football defenders
Canadian sportspeople of Nigerian descent
Canadian Premier League players
Canadian soccer players
Forge FC players
League1 Ontario players
Soccer players from Toronto
Sigma FC players
Syracuse Orange men's soccer players